Mariusz Paweł Stępiński (born 12 May 1995) is a Polish footballer who plays as a striker for Cypriot club Aris Limassol.

Club career

Early career
Born in Sieradz, Poland, Stępiński started his career playing for youth sides Piast Błaszki and Pogoń-Ekolog Zduńska Wola. In 2011, he signed for Ekstraklasa club Widzew Łódź, going on to make 33 appearances and scoring five goals over two seasons.

1. FC Nürnberg
On 5 June 2013, Stępiński signed for German Bundesliga club 1. FC Nürnberg on a three-year contract.

Nantes
As of 2016, Stępinski plays for FC Nantes in the French Ligue 1.

Chievo
On 31 August 2017, he was loaned to Italian side Chievo.

Hellas Verona
On 2 September 2019, he signed for Verona. The deal is a loan from Chievo with obligation to buy at the end of the loan.

Lecce
In October 2020, he signed for Lecce with an option to buy.

Aris Limassol
On 6 August 2021, he was loaned to Cypriot side Aris Limassol with an option to buy at the end of the season. He made his debut on 22 August 2021, where he played for 65 minutes. On 31 August 2022, Stępiński returned to Aris on a permanent basis.

International career
Stępiński represented Poland at various youth levels. He made his first senior appearance on 2 February 2013 in an international friendly against Romania. Poland won 4–1, with Stępiński being subbed on in the 84th minute.

He also played at the 2012 UEFA European Under-17 Football Championship.

He was selected as part of the senior squad for the UEFA Euro 2016.

Career statistics

Club

1 Including Coupe de la Ligue.

International

Honours
Poland U21
Four Nations Tournament: 2014–15

References

External links

 
 

1995 births
Living people
People from Sieradz
Sportspeople from Łódź Voivodeship
Polish footballers
Association football forwards
Ekstraklasa players
Ligue 1 players
Serie A players
Serie B players
Widzew Łódź players
1. FC Nürnberg players
Wisła Kraków players
Ruch Chorzów players
FC Nantes players
A.C. ChievoVerona players
Hellas Verona F.C. players
U.S. Lecce players
Aris Limassol FC players
Poland youth international footballers
Poland under-21 international footballers
Poland international footballers
UEFA Euro 2016 players
Polish expatriate footballers
Expatriate footballers in Germany
Polish expatriate sportspeople in Germany
Expatriate footballers in France
Polish expatriate sportspeople in France
Expatriate footballers in Italy
Polish expatriate sportspeople in Italy
Expatriate footballers in Cyprus
Polish expatriate sportspeople in Cyprus